John Douglas (born 7 May 1943) is an Australian fencer. He competed in the team foil event at the 1964 Summer Olympics.

References

1943 births
Living people
Australian male fencers
Olympic fencers of Australia
Fencers at the 1964 Summer Olympics